Qamata may refer to:

 Qamata, creator god of the Xhosa
 In Chris Hani District, Eastern Cape, South Africa:
 Qamata River, mouth 
 Qamata Basin
 Qamata, Eastern Cape, a small town, 
 Qamata Poort, a village, 
 Qamata Station, a railway station, 
 Qamata Township, township of Intsika Yethu Municipality